The year 2006 is the 1st year in the history of Strikeforce, a mixed martial arts promotion based in the United States. In 2006 Strikeforce held 4 events beginning with, Strikeforce: Shamrock vs. Gracie.

Title fights

Events list

Strikeforce: Shamrock vs. Gracie

Strikeforce: Shamrock vs. Gracie was an event held on March 10, 2006 at the HP Pavilion at San Jose in San Jose, California.

Results

Strikeforce: Revenge

Strikeforce: Revenge was an event held on June 9, 2006 at the HP Pavilion at San Jose in San Jose, California.

Results

Strikeforce: Tank vs. Buentello

Strikeforce: Tank vs. Buentello was an event held on October 7, 2006 at the Save Mart Center in Fresno, California.

Results

Strikeforce: Triple Threat

Strikeforce: Triple Threat was an event held on December 8, 2006 at the HP Pavilion at San Jose in San Jose, California.

Results

See also 
 List of Strikeforce champions
 List of Strikeforce events

References

Strikeforce (mixed martial arts) events
2006 in mixed martial arts